India's Most Distinguished Musician In Concert is a 1962 live album released by Ravi Shankar.  It was recorded 19 November 1961 during one of Shankar's early seminal American performances, at UCLA.  It was later digitally remastered and released in CD format through Angel Records. The digital remastering was by Squires Productions.
 
Supporting musicians are Kanai Dutt on tabla and Nodu Mullick on Tamboura.

Track listing

"Madhuvanti" – 23:53
"Dhun in Mishra Mand" – 18:08

References

External links
Amazon.com listing

1962 live albums
Ravi Shankar albums
Angel Records live albums
World Pacific Records live albums
Live albums by Indian artists